Taitz is a surname. Notable people with the surname include:

 Kara Taitz (born 1981), actress
 Max Taitz (1904–1980), scientist in aerodynamics, theory of jet engines and flight testing of aircraft, one of the founders of the Gromov Flight Research Institute
 Orly Taitz (born 1960), dentist, lawyer, leading figure in the "birther" movement